Satpayev can refer to:

 Kanysh Satbayev, Kazakhstani scientist
 Satbayev (city), a city in Karagandy Province, Kazakhstan